Start a War is the fourth studio album by American heavy metal band Static-X, released in June 2005. A special version was shipped with an additional DVD titled X-Rated. It is the last album for 15 years to feature Ulrich Wild as a producer and/or a mixer, until Project: Regeneration Vol. 1 in 2020.

Album information
This is the first studio album with drumming provided by Nick Oshiro, and the second and last album that guitarist Tripp Eisen wrote and performed on. The album marks the return of former guitarist Koichi Fukuda, who helped with the programming, and according to Static-X's online forums, Fukuda completed additional guitar parts in three songs left unfinished by Eisen. The album continues the change in sound found on Shadow Zone but many of the songs featured on Start a War are heavier and feature a lot more screaming and aggressive lyrics. The whole tone of the album is more aggressive than Shadow Zone.

The song "Pieces" features a guitar solo by Tripp Eisen, a feature not found in earlier albums, but playing a larger role in the following album, Cannibal. When asked about the album, Wayne Static said "We wanted to try to recreate the fun spirit of Wisconsin Death Trip; having Koichi back, with his flavor, helped."
The song "Start a War" was featured on the WWE SmackDown! vs. Raw 2006 video game soundtrack, and later on in Project Gotham Racing 3. "Skinnyman" was featured on Need for Speed: Most Wanted, though in a censored version. "I'm the One" was featured in Greg Hastings' Tournament Paintball, both the original version and the "Wayne Static's Destroyer Remix".

The album debuted at #29 on the Billboard 200, selling 35,416 copies in its first week.

Track listing

DVD version (X-Rated) 
Start a War was also available in a bonus edition digipak with a DVD titled X-Rated.

Band footage
Most of the DVD was filmed whilst guitarist Tripp Eisen was in the band. When he left the band, he had to be 'edited' out of the DVD, though he can still be seen in some shots. New live footage was filmed with Koichi Fukuda. Consequently, this means that most of the DVD has footage only of Static, Campos and Oshiro.

Contents of the DVD
 Making of the record. (Footage of the band making/recording the record and a footage of a photoshoot.)
 Rehearsal footage. (In order - "The Enemy", "Start a War", "I'm the One", "Dirthouse")
 Live tour footage. Each song also has footage of the band's crazy antics (in order - "Permanence", "The Trance Is the Motion", "Monster")
 "Desert Fun" - Wayne and Tony driving around the desert in trucks with the tracks "Otsego Amigo" and "I Want to Fucking Break It" being played.
 Instrumental songs ("Dirthouse", "Otsego Amigo", "Pieces", "Skinnyman", "Start a War")

Personnel
 Static-X
 Wayne Static – lead vocals, rhythm guitar, keyboards, production
 Tony Campos – bass, backing vocals, production
 Tripp Eisen – lead guitar, songwriting
 Nick Oshiro – drums
 Koichi Fukuda – programming, lead guitar
 Ulrich Wild – production, engineering, mixing, programming
 Tom Whalley – production
 Daniel Wild – percussion
 Steven Gilmore – artwork
 Jason Freedman – sound effects
 P. R. Brown – photography
 Filmmakers – Troy Wallace, Matt Eidson, Richie Riot, Andy "Matahaji" Sandoval, John Toler

Chart positions

Album

Singles

References

2005 albums
Static-X albums
Warner Records albums
Albums produced by Ulrich Wild